"I Lived It" is a song written by Rhett Akins, Ashley Gorley, Ben Hayslip, and Ross Copperman and recorded by American country music singer Blake Shelton. It was released in January 2018 as the second single from Shelton's 2017 album Texoma Shore and would be used for Shelton's other album Fully Loaded: God's Country.

Content
"I Lived It" features a nostalgic look at the narrator's childhood. Shelton told The Boot that the song "really stands out to everybody as maybe the best song on the album".

Commercial performance
The song peaked at No. 3 on the Country Airplay chart for chart dated June 30, 2018.  The song has sold 153,000 copies in the United States as of June 2018.  It was certified Gold by the RIAA on July 31, 2019 for 500,000 units in sales and streams.

Music video
The accompanying music video for this song features photographs from Shelton's childhood and teenage years, interspersed with flashbacks and footage of Blake performing. It was filmed north of Los Angeles, CA, and directed by Adam Rothlein.

Charts

Weekly charts

Year-end charts

Certifications

References

2018 singles
Blake Shelton songs
Songs written by Rhett Akins
Songs written by Ashley Gorley
Songs written by Ben Hayslip
Songs written by Ross Copperman
Warner Records Nashville singles
Song recordings produced by Scott Hendricks
2017 songs
Country ballads